The Kuungkari are an indigenous Australian people of Queensland. They are to be distinguished from the Kunggari.

Name
According to an early Migrant, J. Heagney, the word kuungkari (koongerri) meant "dry."

Country
The traditional tribal lands of the Kunggari occupied  with extensive stretches of open grasslands. They lived around the eastern bank of the Thomson and also on Cooper (Barcoo) rivers. Their western extensions ran to Jundah. The northern boundary lay at Westland and in the vicinity of Longreach. Towards the east, they took in Avington, Blackall, and Terrick Terrick. Their southern frontier ran from the western flank of the Grey Range through to Cheviot Range, Powell Creek, and Welford.

Social organization
The Kuungkari were divided into at least five hordes.
 Torraburri
 Yankibura
 Mokaburra

Initiation
They were one of the tribes that did not adopt the rite of circumcision into their initiatory practices.

History of contact
White settlement in this area began around 1874-1878. It was estimated that at the time of first contact, the population of this area, including not only the Kuungkari, but two other tribes (the Bidia), was around 1,200. By 1883, women outnumbered the men, and an observer explained the reason:
"The women at present (1883) considerably outnumber the men, many of the latter having been shot down by the Whites and Native Police when they first established themselves in the district... Since the advent of the Whites, few children are reared—the rifle, syphilis, and debauchery having, as usual, commenced the work of extermination."

Alternative names
 Koonkerri
 Kunggari
 Kungeri, Koongerri
 Yangeeberra
 Tarawalla. (eastern dialect name).

Notes

Citations

Sources

Aboriginal peoples of Queensland